Glossodoris hikuerensis, is a species of sea slug, a colorful nudibranch, a marine gastropod mollusc in the family Chromodorididae.

Distribution
This species occurs in the tropical Indo-Pacific Ocean. It has been observed in localities as far apart as East Africa in the Indian Ocean to French Polynesia in the Pacific.

Description
Glossodoris hikuerensis has a pale-brown body which is covered by speckled white dots. It has a very frilly mantle edged with brown-black-brown lines. Its gills are semi-translucent white, and its rhinophores have the same speckled pale-brown pattern as its body. Glossodoris hikuerensis is a relatively large nudibranch and can reach at least 100 mm in length.

Ecology
This species, like many other nudibranchs, feeds on sponges. The only sponge identified as its food source is Hyrtios erectus. When disturbed, Glossodoris hikuerensis releases a milky-white substance which is a form of chemical defence.

References

External links
 Glossodoris hikuerensis page at nudipixel
 

Chromodorididae
Gastropods described in 1954
Taxa named by Alice Pruvot-Fol